Dmitry Tursunov was the defending champion but lost in the first round to qualifier Philipp Petzschner.
David Ferrer won the title by beating Petzschner 6–3, 6–4 in the final.

Seeds

Draw

Finals

Top half

Bottom half

Qualifying

Seeds

Qualifiers

Draw

First qualifier

Second qualifier

Third qualifier

Fourth qualifier

References
 Main Draw
 Qualifying Draw

UNICEF Open - Singles
2012 Men's Singles